The 2015 season for the  began in January with the Tour Down Under. As a UCI WorldTeam, they were automatically invited and obligated to send a squad to every event in the UCI World Tour.

In September 2014 German shampoo manufacturer Alpecin announced that they would co-sponsor the team alongside Giant for the 2015 season. In December 2014 Sunweb (a Dutch owned international tour operator) was announced as a new major sponsor of the team, signing a 2-year deal.

Team roster

Riders who joined the team for the 2015 season

Riders who left the team during or after the 2014 season

Season victories

National, Continental and World champions 2015

References

External links
 

Giant Alcepin
2015
Giant Alcepin